Piedmont is an unincorporated community in Greenwood County, Kansas, United States. As of the 2020 census, the population of the community and nearby areas was 52.

History
Piedmont was founded about 1880. The first post office in Piedmont was established in May 1880.  Piedmont has a post office with ZIP code 67122.

Demographics

For statistical purposes, the United States Census Bureau has defined this community as a census-designated place (CDP).

Education
The community is served by Eureka USD 389 public school district.

References

Further reading

External links
 Greenwood County maps: Current, Historic, KDOT

Unincorporated communities in Greenwood County, Kansas
Unincorporated communities in Kansas